The Piano Concerto No. 4 in C minor, Op. 44 was composed by Camille Saint-Saëns in 1875. It was premièred on October 31, 1875, at the Théâtre du Châtelet of Paris, with the composer as the soloist.  The concerto is dedicated to Anton Door, a professor of piano at the Vienna Conservatory. It continues to be one of Saint-Saëns' most popular piano concertos, second only to the Piano Concerto No. 2 in G minor.

Structure 
The fourth piano concerto is the composer's most structurally innovative piano concerto. In one sense it is structured like a four-movement symphony, but these are grouped in pairs. That is, the piece is divided into two parts, each of which combines two main movements (I. A moderate-tempo Theme and Variations in C minor; II. A slower, related Theme and Variations in A major; III. Scherzo in C minor; IV. Finale in C major). However, in each part there is a bridge-like transitional section, between the two main "movements" – for example, a fugal Andante in part II functions as an interlude between the two main triple-meter sections.

Instrumentation 
The concerto is scored for solo piano, 2 flutes, 2 oboes, 2 clarinets, 2 bassoons, 2 horns, 2 trumpets, 3 trombones, timpani and strings.

References

Recordings
 Alfred Cortot, piano, Orchestre de la Société des Concerts du Conservatoire, conducted by Charles Munch 1935. Report CD Naxos 2000
Lélia Gousseau, piano, Orchestre National de la RTF, conducted by André Cluytens (Live 11/12/1956). CD INA 2014
Jeanne-Marie Darré, Complete piano concertos, Orchestre de la Radiodiffusion française, conductedby Louis Fourestier. Recorded 1955-1957. 2 CD Emi 1996
Alexander Brailowsky, piano, Boston Symphony Orchestra, conducted by Charles Munch. LP His Master's Voice 1954
Grant Johannesen, piano, Philarmonia Orchestra, conducted by Georges Tzipine. LP His Master's Voice 1958
 Robert Casadesus, piano, New York Philharmonic, conducted by Leonard Bernstein. 1962. Report CD Sony 1993
François-René Duchable, piano, Orchestre Philharmonique de Strsbourg, conducted by Alain Lombard (with piano concerto n°2). CD Erato 1982.
Stephen Hough, City of Birmingham Symphony Orchestra, conducted by Sakari Oramo. CD Hyperion 2001. Gramophone Awards record of the year 2002. Diapason d'or, Choc Le Monde la Musique
Jean-François Heisser, piano, Les Siècles, conducted by François-Xavier Roth. CD Actes Sud 2010
 Alexandre Kantorow, piano, Tapiola Sinfonietta, conducted by Jean-Jacques Kantorow (with piano concertos n°3 & 5). SACD Bis 2019. Diapason d'or, Choc de Classica

External links

 Daniel M. Fallon, "The Genesis of Saint-Saëns' Piano Concerto No. 4". Saint-Saëns' Piano Concerto No. 4 was based on an introduction to an unfinished symphony which the 19-year-old composer wrote and then abandoned. Nearly every bar of the concerto evolves from this draft, providing a rare opportunity to understand Saint-Saëns' compositional craft.

Piano concerto 4
1875 compositions
Compositions in C minor